Scott Ian Major (born 4 July 1975) is an Australian actor and TV and film director, best known for his roles as Peter Rivers in the 1994 television teen drama series Heartbreak High and Lucas Fitzgerald in soap opera Neighbours.

Career
Major's acting debut was playing Murray on Home and Away in the 1990s. He played a student in the comedy series Late For School in 1992, and then joined the cast of Neighbours for three months in 1993 as Darren Stark.

Major appeared in the 1993 Australian romantic comedy film The Heartbreak Kid, with Alex Dimitriades and Claudia Karvan. Major reprise his role as Peter Rivers in Heartbreak High from 1994 to 1995. In 1998 he appeared in an episode of All Saints (Season 2 – "If these walls could talk"). In 1999 he was cast in the Aussie film Envy (titled as The New Girlfriend in the United States). Two years later he had a small role as a welfare officer in the book to film production He Died with a Felafel in His Hand, the novel was written by John Birmingham.

Major had a major role the Australian drama, Always Greener as Tom Morgan, which was shown on the Seven Network between 2001 and 2003. He also wrote, produced, directed and starred in his own play called Both Sides of the Bar at the 2006 Edinburgh Festival Fringe. Spending two years in the UK, he appeared in an episode of the BBC soap Doctors in 2007 and also starred in the first episode of the second series of Love Soup, a BBC comedy starring Tamsin Greig.

Major returned to Australia and began appearing in Neighbours from July 2008 as Lucas Fitzgerald. On 1 July 2013, it was announced that Major had left the show.

In December 2010, the actor revealed that he has been directing some episodes of Neighbours with the help of an existing television director. Major has admitted that he finds the directing part of his job "very tough to fit it in with the acting" because he is "running from location to location and getting the scene shot and then putting a different hat on and directing a scene." Of his decision to take on the new role, Major has said "I want to do it all. I also do a lot of writing. I write my own plays and put them on, direct and produce them.  Australia is a very small industry acting-wise. I've been doing it professionally for 21 years and you just have to have more strings to your bow than acting." In 2019, Major won Best Direction in a TV or SVOD Drama Serial for his work on "Episode 7776A" at the Australian Directors' Guild Awards. He was nominated in the same category for "Episode 7776B".

Major directed episodes of the 2018 drama series Playing for Keeps. He also directed the 2021 miniseries Lie With Me created by Neighbours''' executive producer Jason Herbison. Major has filmed a part in the upcoming film titled Residence, playing Cormac the Shepherd. He will also direct the 2022 psychological thriller series Riptide''.

Filmography

References

External links
Official website
 

1975 births
20th-century Australian male actors
21st-century Australian male actors
Australian male film actors
Australian male soap opera actors
Film directors from Melbourne
Living people
Male actors from Melbourne